Opus Magnum is the third studio album by Austrian melodic death metal band Hollenthon, released by Napalm Records in 2008. Limited edition digipack contains bonus track, "The Bazaar" (originally performed by The Tea Party) and video clip for "Son of Perdition".

Track listing 
Music by Martin Schirenc, lyrics by Elena Schirenc, except "The Bazaar" by Jeff Martin, Stuart Chatwood and Jeff Burrows

 "On the Wings of a Dove" – 5:00
 "To Fabled Lands" – 5:53
 "Son of Perdition" – 4:52
 "Ars Moriendi" – 5:33
 "Once We Were Kings" – 4:50
 "Of Splendid Worlds" – 6:08
 "Dying Embers" – 5:28
 "Misterium Babel" – 7:30
 "The Bazaar" – 4:28 (The Tea Party cover, bonus track)

Personnel

Hollenthon
 Martin Schirenc - vocals, guitars, keyboards, orchestration
 Martin Arzberger - guitars
 Gregor Marboe - bass, vocals
 Mike Gröger - drums, percussion
 Elena Schirenc - vocals

Production
Produced, recorded, engineered & mixed By Martin Schirenc

References

Hollenthon albums
2008 albums
Napalm Records albums